Taylor Auerbach (born 23 July 1991) is an Australian journalist who rose to prominence after becoming the youngest ever winner of the Australian Millionaire Hot Seat game show, a spinoff version of Who Wants to Be a Millionaire?.

Millionaire Saga 
Auerbach made national news after the host of the program Eddie McGuire promised Taylor a job at Channel 9 if he got the crucial final question right – worth A$50,000.Auerbach correctly identified the colour of London's Financial Times as salmon pink and was awarded the money. However, when it became clear that McGuire had only promised the job as banter for the cameras, a media storm across various newspapers and the other Australian TV channels erupted.Auerbach, who says he never expected the job and was grateful for what he got, appeared on Channel 7's 6 pm News, The Morning Show, Melbourne's Herald Sun newspaper, The Macarthur Chronicle and on various radio stations including C91.3 and Melbourne's Star FM. He remained in defence of McGuire throughout these appearances.

Come Dine with Me 
Auerbach also appeared on episodes 1–5 of series 2 of the Australian spinoff of Come Dine with Me, a reality cooking competition where guests take turns to host dinner parties in their own home. A fan favourite, Auerbach finished third of the five contestants after serving Helen (a difficult and notoriously rude contestant) allegedly raw chicken on the final night.The series also aired in England under the name of Come Dine with Me Downunder

Personal life 
Auerbach was born in Bondi, NSW on 23 July 1991.

References 

1991 births
Living people
Australian journalists
Australian television personalities
Who Wants to Be a Millionaire?